Christina Magdalena (Kieka) Mynhardt (née Steyn; born 1953) is a South African born Canadian mathematician known for her work on dominating sets in graph theory, including domination versions of the eight queens puzzle. She is a professor of mathematics and statistics at the University of Victoria in Canada.

Education and career
Mynhardt was born in Cape Town, and was a student at the Hoërskool Lichtenburg. She completed her Ph.D. at Rand Afrikaans University (now incorporated into the University of Johannesburg) in 1979, supervised by Izak Broere. Her dissertation, The -constructability of graphs, gave a conjectured construction for the planar graphs by repeatedly adding vertices with prescribed neighborhoods.
She became a faculty member at the University of Pretoria and then the University of South Africa before moving to the University of Victoria.

Recognition
In 1995, Mynhardt was selected as one of the founding members of the Academy of Science of South Africa.
She was a 2005 recipient of the Dignitas Award of the University of Johannesburg Alumni.

References

External links
Home page
Faces of UVic Research: Kieka Mynhardt (video)

1953 births
Living people
South African mathematicians
Members of the Academy of Science of South Africa
Canadian mathematicians
Women mathematicians
Graph theorists
University of Johannesburg alumni
Academic staff of the University of Pretoria
Academic staff of the University of South Africa
Academic staff of the University of Victoria